The Death Valley expedition was an 1891 expedition to discover the geographic distributions of plants (phytogeography) and animals in California's Death Valley.

It was the first of a series of expeditions funded by an 1890 act of the United States Congress. The expedition included biologists, naturalists, botanists, and zoologists.

They produced valuable reports of historic significance in several fields, including "Botany of the Death Valley Expedition", “The Death Valley Expedition: A Biological Survey of Parts of California, Nevada, Arizona, and Utah”, and "Annotated List of the Reptiles and Batrachians Collected by the Death Valley Expedition in 1891, with Descriptions of New Species".

References

External links
Coville's Field notes, Death Valley Expedition, 1891, Smithsonian Digital Volunteers
Bailey's Field notes, Death Valley Expedition, 1891, Smithsonian Digital Volunteers

Death Valley expedition
Death Valley
Death Valley expedition
1891 in California
Death Valley expedition
Death Valley expedition
Natural history of Inyo County, California
Death Valley Expedition
Death Valley expedition
Death Valley expedition
Death Valley National Park
Death Valley expedition